Loston (born 1982) is an Australian music producer and graphic designer.

Loston may also refer to:

 Adena Williams Loston (born 1952), an American educator
 Craig Loston (born 1989), an American football player
 Loston Harris, an American jazz musician
 Loston Wallace (born 1970), an American comic book artist

See also 
 Losten